Melling-with-Wrayton is a civil parish in Lancaster, Lancashire, England.  It contains 22 listed buildings that are recorded in the National Heritage List for England.  Of these, one is listed at Grade I, the highest of the three grades, one is at Grade II*, the middle grade, and the others are at Grade II, the lowest grade.  The parish contains the village of Melling and the hamlet of Wrayton, and is otherwise rural.  Most of the listed buildings are houses, farmhouses and associated structures.  The others include a church and associated structures, and two milestones.

Key

Buildings

Notes and references

Notes

Citations

Sources

Lists of listed buildings in Lancashire
Buildings and structures in the City of Lancaster